Gökay Iravul (born 18 October 1992) is a Turkish footballer who plays as a midfielder for TFF Third League club Nevşehir Belediyespor.

Early life
Iravul began his footballing career with local club Denizlispor in 2001, starting with the Junior Team (10–12 years old). After one year, Iravul was promoted to the Star Team (12–14) and began playing for the B Youth Team (14–16) soon after. Iravul impressed Fenerbahçe scouts at a B Youth Team match between Denizlispor and Fenerbahçe and was signed by the Istanbul club a year later.

Career
Iravul signed his first professional contract with Fenerbahçe on 3 July 2007. He began with playing with the Super Youth Team (16–18) in 2008, totaling three goals in 29 appearances. The following season, Iravul was promoted to the A2 squad. Iravul has scored seven goals in 30 appearances in the A2 League.
Fenerbahçe signed him to a three-year contract extension at the start of the 2010–11 season and the midfielder was included in the squad for pre-season preparations. Iravul earned his first senior team call-up under Aykut Kocaman and made his professional debut against Gençlerbirliği on 2 October 2010, coming on as a substitution for Mamadou Niang in the 88th minute.

International career
Iravul began his international career with the Turkey U-15 squad. He was a part of the Turkey squad at the 2009 FIFA U-17 World Cup, making four appearances and scoring a goal.

Career statistics

Honours
Süper Lig (1): 2010–11
Türkiye Kupası (1): 2011–12

Personal life
Iravul has one older sister. His mother is a housewife and his father is a retired bank manager.

Notes

References

External links
 
 
 
 

1991 births
Sportspeople from Denizli
Living people
Turkish footballers
Turkey youth international footballers
Turkey under-21 international footballers
Association football midfielders
Denizlispor footballers
Fenerbahçe S.K. footballers
Manisaspor footballers
Adana Demirspor footballers
Gaziantep F.K. footballers
Alanyaspor footballers
Samsunspor footballers
Fatih Karagümrük S.K. footballers
Bayrampaşaspor footballers
Süper Lig players
TFF First League players
TFF Second League players
TFF Third League players